Hailey Breyanne Armstrong (born March 8, 1996) is a Canadian curler from Carleton Place, Ontario. She currently skips her own team out of Waterloo, Ontario.

Career
After winning the 2017 Ontario Junior Curling Championships, Armstrong competed in her lone Canadian Junior Curling Championships of her junior career at the 2017 Canadian Junior Curling Championships. She represented Ontario with teammates Grace Holyoke at third, Lindsay Dubue at second and Marcia Richardson at lead. They finished the round robin and championship pools with an unblemished 10–0 record, qualifying directly for the final where they faced Alberta's Kristen Streifel. Tied 3–3 with hammer in the tenth end, Armstrong was heavy on her final draw, giving Alberta a steal of two and the 5–3 win. Armstrong aged out of juniors the following season and began skipping her own team on the World Curling Tour. Her team qualified for the 2018 Ontario Scotties Tournament of Hearts, where they went 0–3 in the triple knockout tournament. After failing to qualify for the provincial championship in 2019, she joined the Laurie St-Georges rink out of Quebec as their third.

In their first season together, Team St-Georges competed in their first Grand Slam of Curling event at the 2019 Tour Challenge Tier 2 where they lost in a tiebreaker to Megan Balsdon. They also competed in their first provincial women's championship at the 2020 Quebec Scotties Tournament of Hearts. After finishing the round robin in first place, they lost in the final to Noémie Verreault 3–1. 

Due to the COVID-19 pandemic in Quebec, the 2021 Quebec Scotties Tournament of Hearts was cancelled. Since the defending champions, Team Noémie Verreault, had disbanded, Team St-Georges (the 2020 provincial runner-up) was invited to represent Quebec at the 2021 Scotties Tournament of Hearts, which they accepted. The event was played in a bio-secure bubble in Calgary, Alberta to prevent the spread of the virus. At the Hearts, Armstrong and her teammates received a lot of media attention and fans thanks to their positive attitudes and strong play on the ice. They also defeated multiple higher ranked teams in the tournament including the Wild Card team of Tracy Fleury (skipped by Chelsea Carey), Corryn Brown's British Columbia rink and Suzanne Birt's team out of Prince Edward Island. Ultimately, they finished the event with a 6–6 record and a seventh place finish.

Team St-Georges began the 2021–22 season with a semifinal finish at the 2021 Oakville Fall Classic where they lost to the event winners Team Jamie Sinclair. They only made the playoffs at one other tour event at the Stu Sells 1824 Halifax Classic, losing in the quarterfinals to Team Jill Brothers. Due to the COVID-19 pandemic in Canada, the qualification process for the 2021 Canadian Olympic Curling Trials had to be modified to qualify enough teams for the championship. In these modifications, Curling Canada created the 2021 Canadian Curling Pre-Trials Direct-Entry Event, an event where eight teams would compete to try to earn one of two spots into the 2021 Canadian Olympic Curling Pre-Trials. Team St-Georges qualified for the Pre-Trials Direct-Entry Event as the second seed. The team won their opening match, but then lost three straight games and were eliminated from the event. The Quebec Scotties Tournament of Hearts was again cancelled due to the pandemic and Team St-Georges were once again selected to represent Quebec at the national women's championship. The team could not replicate their successful run from 2021, finishing the 2022 Scotties Tournament of Hearts with a 3–5 record. They won their opening two matches against Alberta's Laura Walker and the Yukon's Hailey Birnie and their last game against Nova Scotia's Christina Black.

Personal life
Armstrong began curling at age 9. She grew up in Perth, and at the time of the 2017 Canadian Juniors, she was living in Innisville, Ontario. Armstrong was business administration student at Algonquin College, and is now a bachelor of commerce student at Nipissing University.

Teams

References

External links

1996 births
Canadian women curlers
Living people
Algonquin College alumni
People from Carleton Place
Curlers from Ottawa
People from Perth, Ontario
Nipissing University alumni
21st-century Canadian women